Joshan is a . It was named for a vessel that was sunk by missiles fired from  the US warships  and  during Operation Praying Mantis in the Persian Gulf on 18 April 1988.

Joshans launch was timed to coincide with Sacred Defense Week (22–28 September) and took place at Noshahr's Imam Khomeini Marine Sciences University.

...enjoys the world's latest technology, specially with regard to its military, electrical and electronic systems, frame and chassis, and it has the capabilities required for launching powerful missiles.

See also 

 List of current ships of the Islamic Republic of Iran Navy
 List of military equipment manufactured in Iran

References

Missile boats of the Islamic Republic of Iran Navy
Ships built at Shahid Tamjidi shipyard
Missile boats of Iran
Ships of the Islamic Republic of Iran Navy
Ships built in Iran